Kabilan Vairamuthu is a Tamil writer from Tamil Nadu the southern state of India. He is an engineering graduate who went on to pursue communication for social change in the school of Journalism - UQ -Australia. After serving as an executive producer for  programming and current affairs in the Tamil television industry for three plus years, Kabilan is now a full-time writer with the Tamil film industry. He is the son of the famous Tamil poet and lyricist Vairamuthu.

Kabilan published his first book at 18. He is the author of five poetry collections, a short story collection and three novels. Kabilan Vairamuthu represented Tamil Nadu at the Sahitya Akademi's north eastern and southern poetry forum 2014 held in Kochi. During his college days he founded Makkal Anukka Peravai, a socio-political organization which works to address the self and social issues of the younger generation. The school once formulated will function to re-culture and professionalize the political practices of the state. The idea is to create sensible substance and a feasible platform for the youngsters to actively participate in development politics.

Family
Kabilan Vairamuthu is the second son of authors Vairamuthu and Ponmani Vairamuthu. Vairamuthu is a lyricist and a seven-time National Award winner. Ponmani, a Tamil scholar, published poetry collections and a novel and worked as a lecturer in Meenakshi College for Women, Chennai for 22 years. Kabilan's elder brother Madhan Karky has a doctorate in sensor networks and is a lyricist. Kabilan's wife Dr.Ramya, is a gynecologist and laproscopic surgeon. Mettoori Kabilan is the kid of the family. She has been named after "Mettoor" kabilan's native village. The village is now an under water bed at the Vaigam Dam.

Education and career
Kabilan worked in a software company. After two years he decided to switch to journalism and media. He pursued his Masters in Communication for Social Change in the University of Queensland, Australia.

As one of the creative minds in new generation media, Kabilan was involved in the launch of puthiya thalaimurai – a 24-hour news channel and Puthuyugam a GEC all in Tamil. The following were the shows produced so far:

Puthiyathalaimurai 
 Kalam Irangiyavargal (Anchor and Producer) – a show on young aspiring entrepreneurs
 Vidai Thedum Vivaathangal (Anchor and Producer) – A focus group on social issues

Puthuyugam
 Thiramai Pongum Tamizhagam (Executive Producer) – showcasing interesting talents
 Gaanamum Kaatchiyum (Executive Producer) – a show which reviews film songs – a first time in television
 Vina Vidai Vettai (Executive Producer) – A quiz on India

Poetry
 Ulagam Yaavayum
 Endraan Kavingan
 Manithanaku Aduthavan
 Kadavulodu Pechuvaarthai
 Kavithaigal 100

Short Story
 Kathai – Kabilan Vairamuthu
 AmbaraaThooni (2020) –  Kabilan Vairamuthu’s second short stories collection. The compilation has stories of past present and future.

Novels
Boomerang Bhoomi – based on the historical connection between the South Indian race and the Australian aborigines, the novel is a message against global terrorism. Many research students from reputed universities across the state have chosen this novel for their academic papers.
Uyirsol – a true story based on post-natal depression - the book carries a CD which has the theme song for the novel
Meinigari - a novel based on making of a reality show in a general entertainment channel - official site 
Aagol - A socio political time travel novel on digital feudalism in the backdrop of the criminal tribe act

Filmography

Screenwriting Projects
 2017 Kavan (based on Meinigari)
 2017 Vivegam
 2020 Asuraguru
 2020 Thatrom Thookrom
 TBA Thalli Pogathey
 TBA Indian 2

Lyrics
 Udhayam NH4
 Vennila Veedu
 Sivappu
 Poriyaalan
 Jeeva
 Anegan
 Aayirathil Iruvar
 Vellaiya Irukiravan Poi Solla Maatan
Arthanari
 Indrajith
 Peigal Jaakkirathai
 Kalam
 Kavan
 Vivegam
 Traffic Ramasamy
 Embiran
 Meendum Oru Mariyathai
 Imaikka Nodigal
 Kaappaan
 Vantha Rajavathaan Varuven
 July Kaatril
 Comali
 Thatrom Thookrom
 Asura Guru
 Naan Sirithal
 Naanum Single Thaan
 The Great Indian Kitchen

Independent Song
 Yenthiru Anjali Yenthiru Mandhira KannilaeDocumentary
 Ilaingargal Ennum Naam''

References

External links
Uyirsol
Social Activities 
Profile Pictures 

1982 births
Living people
Indian male screenwriters
Tamil film poets
Tamil screenwriters
Tamil writers
Writers from Chennai
Tamil-language lyricists